Bowring Institute is a Private members' club in Bangalore, India. It was founded in 1868 by Benjamin Lewis Rice. It is named after Lewin Bentham Bowring. It is best known for its tennis facilities, but also has what is probably the largest library in Bangalore.

History 
The Bowring Institute completed 130 and 150 years in 2018 — 130 because the foundation stone of the current 12-acre property on St Mark’s Road was laid on 22 November 1888. However, the elite members-only club had an earlier avatar, which happened in 1868.

The institute was formed at a time when the industrial revolution was at its peak in Europe.

References 

Clubs and societies in India